Otto F. Ege (1888–1951) was a teacher, lecturer, bookseller, and well-known book-breaker. He worked for many years at the Cleveland Institute of Art where he served as Chair of the Department of Teacher Training, instructor of Lettering, Layout, and Typography, and Dean. He was also employed by the School of Library Science at Case Western Reserve University as a lecturer on the History of the Book, and instructor of History and Art of the Book.

Otto Ege's greatest fame, however, came as a result of his book-breaking. Over a period of decades in the early 20th century, Ege systematically removed the pages of some 50 illuminated medieval manuscripts, and divided them into 40 unique compilation boxes, commonly referred to as "Otto Ege Portfolios". These portfolios were in turn sold and distributed world wide. Although strong profits were made from each sale, Ege defended his actions by stating, "Surely to allow a thousand people 'to have and to hold' an original manuscript leaf, and to get a thrill and understanding that comes only from actual and frequent contact with these art heritages, is justification enough for the scattering of fragments".

Over the last several years, Prof. Peter Stoicheff of the University of Saskatchewan has been working to locate all existing Ege Portfolios, and to foster co-operation from their respective owners in creating an "Ege Medieval Manuscript Database" with the ultimate goal being the digital reconstruction of the complete books.

Ege's personal collection, including 50 unbroken manuscript books, was in 2015 acquired by the Beinecke Rare Book & Manuscript Library (part of Yale University Library).

See also
Digital fragmentology reconstruction of manuscripts

References and notes

External links
 Otto F. Ege: Fifty Original Leaves from Medieval Manuscripts Digital Collection created at Stony Brook University Libraries. Stony Brook University Libraries Special Collections and University Archives owns No. 19 of the 40 unique sets created by Ege.
 Book of Hours (Use of Paris) – Reconstructed Quire/Book A reconstruction of a Book of Hours dismantled in part by Otto Ege (Cleveland, OH) in the 1940s and used as no. 30 in his "Fifty Original Leaves of Medieval Manuscripts" portfolios. The individual leaves were catalogued in the fall of 2017 by students in Lisa Fagin Davis' course at the Simmons School of Library and Information Science (Boston, MA), "The Medieval Manuscript from Charlemagne to Gutenberg." 
 Otto F. Ege Collection The Ege Manuscript Leaf Portfolios (maintained by Denison University to collect information about the portfolios).
 David Bindle, 50 Medieval Manuscript Leaves the Otto Ege Collection at the University of Saskatchewan Library. Complete book on line with images of all 50 manuscripts.
 

1888 births
1951 deaths
20th-century American educators
Case Western Reserve University faculty
American booksellers
American art collectors